Peter von Koskull (born 19 January 1963) is a Finnish sailor. He competed at the 1984 Summer Olympics and the 1988 Summer Olympics.

References

External links
 

1963 births
Living people
Finnish male sailors (sport)
Olympic sailors of Finland
Sailors at the 1984 Summer Olympics – 470
Sailors at the 1988 Summer Olympics – 470
Sportspeople from Helsinki